The HW-4 Flamingo, was a Brazilian two-seat in tandem-seat configuration, sailplane aircraft designed and manufactured for general flying.

Design and development
The Flamingo was built in Bauru in 1944, designed by Kurt Henrich and Hand Widmer, it resembled the high performance German gliders of the time. When designing it, Widmer chose a profile with little penetration, but high elevation index. He made more than 40 drawings, and it was with these that the team started the work. Despite the great performance at low speed, it was not adequate to consider it a racing sailplane. The wings profile were strong cambered. Lighter than contemporary German DFS Weihe, though of similar general dimensions.

Construction
It was made largely of domestic wood, the outside was made with plywood and painted linho.

Operational history
It was based at the Aeroclube de Bauru while it was operational. He has won numerous Brazilian sailing championships, and several categories. It was retired for a structural reform in 2002, and continued flying until 2006. Its prefix was PT-PAY.

Specifications

See also

 List of gliders

References

1940s Brazilian sailplanes
Aircraft first flown in 1946
Glider aircraft